Gert Bastian (26 March 1923 –  1 October 1992) was a German military officer and politician with the German Green Party.

Biography
Born in Munich, Bastian volunteered for the Wehrmacht in 1941, at the age of nineteen. In World War II he served on the Eastern Front being wounded by a bullet in the right arm and in the head by a grenade fragment. He was also hit by American machine gun fire in France. After the war he started a business which failed and he rejoined the military. From 1956 to 1980 Bastian served in the Bundeswehr—joining as a first lieutenant, promoted in 1962 to the position of general staff officer/officer in the army command staff, and in 1974 promoted to the rank of Brigadier General, chief of staff in the army office—ending his service as a divisional commander with the rank of Major General. During this period Bastian's politics changed radically. In the 1950s he had been a member of the Christian Social Union in his native Bavaria. Yet Bastian was also an opponent of the planned stationing of medium-range missiles with nuclear warheads in Europe and joined the peace movement. In 1980, he outlined those views in a memorandum to the West German government, asking to retire in the face of what he considered unacceptable military policies; his request was rejected and he resigned. In 1981 he was the joint founder of a group called "Generals for Peace". In the 26 April 1994 edition of The Independent newspaper, Günter Bohnsack, who spent 26 years in the Active Measures Department of the Stasi, claimed that "Generals for Peace was conceived, organised and financed by the Stasi ... This created a real power that was in line with Moscow's ideas ... and we always controlled this through our intelligence services in Moscow and East Berlin."

Bastian was, from 29 March 1983 until 18 February 1987, an elected member of the Greens in the German Federal Parliament. Between 10 February 1984 and 18 March 1986, he was an independent member of Parliament having separated from the Green's Parliamentary group several times over his opposition to the rotation principle for leadership then enforced in the Greens. He was then deselected by the Green Party.

In the 1980s, Bastian was, together with his partner Petra Kelly, one of the most important West German supporters of the opposition in the German Democratic Republic.

Death and murder of Petra Kelly
On 19 October 1992, the decomposing bodies of Bastian and Kelly were discovered in the bedroom of their house in Bonn by police officials after they received a call from both Bastian's wife and Kelly's grandmother who reported that they had not heard from either Bastian or Kelly for a few weeks. The police asserted that Kelly was shot dead while sleeping by Bastian, who then killed himself. Police estimated the deaths had most likely occurred on 1 October but the exact time of death could not be pinpointed due to the delay in finding the bodies and their resultant state of decomposition. Neither Bastian nor Kelly left any written message or other evidence useful to explain the reason of the homicide-suicide. Theories have been put forward that Bastian was afraid of an imminent opening of Stasi files revealing his role as an agent of the East German secret police; but at present no such evidence has emerged.

Bastian was buried in the Nordfriedhof in Schwabing, Munich.

References

External links
 Interview (alongside Petra Kelly) by the Institute of International Studies, UC Berkeley

1923 births
1992 deaths
Suicides by firearm in Germany
German politicians who committed suicide
Bundeswehr generals
Murder–suicides in Germany
Military personnel from Munich
Burials at the Nordfriedhof (Munich)
Major generals of the German Army
Members of the Bundestag for Bavaria
Members of the Bundestag for Alliance 90/The Greens
German Army personnel of World War II